David Notoane (born 7 February 1969) is a South African soccer coach. He coached Santos Cape Town and the Cape Town All Stars, as well as the South African national U-20 and U-23 teams. He also served as assistant coach of the Mamelodi Sundowns and the South African senior national team.

Notoane was the South African U-23 team's coach at the 2020 Summer Olympics, where they lost all three of their group matches. This put his future in jeopardy and he was replaced by Helman Mkhalele some months later.

References

1969 births
Living people
South African soccer managers